The Liberated Earth is a 1946 Soviet war drama film directed by Aleksandr Medvedkin and starring Vera Altayskaya, Aleksandr Khvylya and Emma Tsesarskaya. The film was made at the Sverdlovsk Film Studio.

Cast
 Vasili Vanin as Mulyuk (as V. Vanin)
 Emma Tsesarskaya as Nadezhda Pritulyak
 Sergei Kalinin as Kovrygin (as S. Kalinin)
 Aleksandr Khvylya as Kostenko (as A. Khvylya)
 Aleksandr Denisov as Foma (as A. Denisov)
 Vera Altayskaya as Tanya (as V. Altayskaya)
 Nina Dintan as Darya (as N. Dintan)
 Anastasiya Kozhevnikova as Collective farmer (uncredited)
 Mariya Sapozhnikova as Collective Farmer (uncredited)
 M. Shlenskaya as Collective farmer (uncredited)
 Ekaterina Sipavina as Collective farmer (uncredited)

References

Bibliography
 Liehm, Mira & Liehm, Antonín J. The Most Important Art: Eastern European Film After 1945. University of California Press, 1977.

External links

1946 films
Soviet war drama films
1940s war drama films
1940s Russian-language films
Soviet black-and-white films
1946 drama films